Lago del Salto is a reservoir lake in the Province of Rieti, Lazio, Italy. At an elevation of 535 m, its surface area is 10 km².

Lakes of Lazio